The 5th Artillery Regiment (RA5), (Regimento de Artilharia nº5) is a regiment of the Portuguese Army, which provides the Field Artillery Group for the Intervention Brigade. The RA5 is based at Vendas Novas.

History

1763 - The establishment of the Artillery Regiment of Porto, which is extinct in 1829 as 4th Artillery Regiment of Porto. 
1835 - By decree of Queen Maria II, the date from which came to be used as a military unit. In 1878 Mountain Artillery Brigade is created, with the same installed at Serra do Pilar in 1889, remaining there until disbanded in 1897. Installed in the Serra do Pilar Detach Batteries of the RA6, and in 1897 RA4 in 1899, both from Penafiel, and 5th Artillery Regiment of Viana do Castelo in 1902. 
1911 - Based in the Serra do Pilar RA6 (Mounted), which is considered the unit of origin of the current RA5.
1921 - The designation becomes 6th Artillery Regiment.
1926 - It gets the name 6th Artillery Regiment for the following year, 1927, be called 5th Light Artillery Regiment(RAL5).
1939 - Due to the reorganization of the army is created 2nd Heavy Artillery Regiment (RAP2).
1975 - It took the name of Artillery Regiment of Serra do Pilar (RASP).
1993 - It takes the current designation RA5. Inherits the heritage of the 4th Artillery Regiment of Porto extinct in 1829, the 2nd Mountain Artillery Group and 5th Light Artillery Regiment.

Equipment

Infantry equipment

 Glock 17 Gen 5

 FN SCAR L STD
 FN Minimi Mk3
Browning M2
 FN40GL Grenade launcher
 L16A2 mortar
 Carl Gustav M3

Artillery
 M114 155mm howitzer
AN/TPQ-36 Firefinder radar

Tactical vehicles
 HMMWV M1097 4x4
Mitsubishi L200 4x4
Toyota Land Cruiser HZJ73 4x4
Land Rover Defender 4x4
Iveco 40.10 WM 4x4

Transport vehicles
 MAN 10.224 
Mercedes-Benz 1017
Unimog 1750L
Iveco 90.17 WM

Awards and decorations
Gold Medal of Military Valour
 1st Mountain Artillery Brigade - Portuguese Mozambique 1895 
1st Class Cross of War Medals
 2nd Battery/5th Group of Artillery Battery/CEP -  1918 
 3rd Battery/6th Group of Artillery Battery/CEP -  1918 
 4th Battery/5th Group of Artillery Battery/CEP -  1918 
 1688th Artillery Company/CTI Guinea - Portuguese Guinea 1964/74

References

Sources
http://www.exercito.pt/sites/RA5/Paginas/default.aspx

Army regiments of Portugal
Military of Portugal
Military installations in Portugal